Phlebiella is a genus of crust fungi in the order Polyporales.

Description
Phlebiella species are characterized by pleurobasidia and a lack of cystidia in the hymenium. The genus is otherwise quite variable morphologically; for example, spores range from allantoid (sausage-shaped) to spherical, the surface ornamentation ranges from warted to smooth, and reaction with Melzer's reagent can be amyloid or inamyloid.

Taxonomy
Phlebiella was circumscribed by mycologist Petter Adolf Karsten in 1890. It was pointed out later by Marinus Anton Donk that Karsten did not publish the genus validly, as he did not include a give a generic description. Some authorities have placed Phlebiella in synonymy with Xenasmatella, and the type species, Phlebiella vaga, is placed in this latter genus as Xenasmatella vaga.

Species
Phlebiella argilodes (Bourdot & Galzin) Bondartsev & Singer (1953)
Phlebiella athelioidea N.Maek. (1993) – Japan
Phlebiella californica (Liberta) K.H.Larss. & Hjortstam (1987)
Phlebiella christiansenii (Parmasto) K.H.Larss. & Hjortstam (1987)
Phlebiella fibrillosa (Hallenb.) K.H.Larss. & Hjortstam (1987)
Phlebiella gaspesica (Liberta) K.H.Larss. & Hjortstam (1987)
Phlebiella inopinata (H.S.Jacks.) K.H.Larss. & Hjortstam (1987)
Phlebiella odontioidea (Ryvarden & Liberta) Domański (1991)
Phlebiella paludicola Hjortstam & P.Roberts (1995)

References

Polyporales
Polyporales genera
Taxa named by Petter Adolf Karsten
Taxa described in 1890